SolarX is the performing name of Dr. Roman Belavkin, a Russian electronic music artist and computer scientist.

See also
Music of Russia

References

External links
 SolarX Homepage
 NME interview with SolarX

Techno musicians
Academics of Middlesex University
Living people
Year of birth missing (living people)
Place of birth missing (living people)
Russian computer scientists